Dubai, the largest city in the United Arab Emirates, is home to many extremely tall modern high-rises, 108 of which stand taller than . The tallest building in Dubai is the Burj Khalifa, which rises  and contains 163 floors. The tower has stood as both the tallest building in the world and the tallest man-made structure of any kind in the world since its completion in January 2010. The second-tallest building in Dubai is the  Marina 101, which also stands as the world's fourth tallest residential skyscraper. The skyscrapers of Dubai are, for the most part, clustered in three different locations. The land along E 11 Road was the first to develop, followed by the Dubai Marina neighborhood and the Business Bay district.

Overall, Dubai has 18 completed and topped-out buildings that rise at least  in height, which is more than any other city in the world. Dubai has 73 completed and topped-out buildings that rise at least  in height. Based on the average height of the ten tallest completed buildings, Dubai has the tallest skyline in the Middle East and the world. , the skyline of Dubai is ranked eighth in the world with 248 buildings rising at least  in height.

The history of skyscrapers in Dubai began with the construction of Dubai World Trade Centre in 1979, which is usually regarded as the first high-rise in the city. At the time of its completion, it also stood as the tallest building in the Middle East. In less than ten years, the city has amassed one of the largest skylines in the world; it is now home to the world's tallest building, the world's tallest residence, and the world's second tallest hotel. , 49 new skyscrapers are under construction in Dubai; additionally, there are over 127 active high-rise developments that have been proposed for construction in the city.

Tallest buildings
This includes spires and architectural details but does not include antenna masts. An equal sign (=) following a rank indicates the same height between two or more buildings. The "Year" column indicates the year in which a building was completed.

{{row numbers|
{| class"wikitable sortable"
|-
! Rank
! Name
! Image
! Heightm (ft)
! Floors
! Year
! Reference(s)
! class"unsortable"| Notes
|-
| style"word-spacing: -5px;" "background:#dfd;" | _row_count
|- style="background:#dfd;"
|Burj Khalifa
|
|
|163
|2010
|<ref>

Tallest under construction, approved and proposed

Under construction
This is the list of buildings that are currently under construction in Dubai and are expected to rise to a height of at least . Buildings under construction that have already been topped out are also included, as are those whose construction has been suspended.

Dubai Creek Harbour

Other districts
*Table entries with dashes (—) indicate that information regarding building dates of completion has not yet been released.

On hold
This table lists buildings that were at one time under construction in Dubai and were expected to rise at least  in height, but are now on hold. While not officially cancelled, construction has been suspended on each development.

Approved
This table lists buildings that are approved for construction in Dubai and are expected to rise at least  in height.
*Table entries with dashes (—) indicate that information regarding building dates of completion has not yet been released.

Proposed
This table lists buildings that are proposed for construction in Dubai and are expected to rise at least  in height.

*Table entries with dashes (—) indicate that information regarding building heights and/or dates of completion has not yet been released.

Timeline of tallest buildings

This is a list of the buildings that once were the tallest in Dubai. Despite Dubai's recent major skyscraper boom, there are only seven buildings on the list.

See also

 List of buildings in Dubai
 List of tallest buildings in Asia
 List of cities with most skyscrapers
 List of tallest residential buildings in Dubai
 List of tallest buildings in the United Arab Emirates
 List of real estate in Dubai
 Vue De Lac

References
 Specific

 General

External links

 Overview of Dubai Buildings
 Top 5 Tallest Skyscrapers in Dubai via FlashyDubai.com
 Diagram of Dubai skyscrapers on SkyscraperPage
 CTBUH lists of tallest buildings in Dubai
 Infographics of top 10 tallest buildings in Dubai

Buildings and structures in Dubai
Dubai
tallest buildings